Abhay Narayan is an Indian politician and a member of the 16th Legislative Assembly of Uttar Pradesh of India. He represents the Sagri constituency of Uttar Pradesh and is a member of the Samajwadi Party.

Early life and education
Abhay Narayan was born in Azamgarh, Uttar Pradesh. He holds a Bachelor's degree.

Political career
Abhay Narayan has been a MLA for one term. He represented the Sagri constituency and is a member of the Samajwadi Party.

Posts Held

See also
Sagri
Politics of India
Sixteenth Legislative Assembly of Uttar Pradesh
Uttar Pradesh Legislative Assembly

References 

Samajwadi Party politicians
Uttar Pradesh MLAs 2012–2017
Politicians from Azamgarh district
1957 births
Living people